The men's doubles badminton event at the 2019 Pan American Games will be held from July 30 – August 2nd at the Polideportivo 3 in Lima, Peru. The defending Pan American Games champion is Phillip Chew and Sattawat Pongnairat of the United States.

Each National Olympic Committee could enter a maximum of four athletes (two pairs) into the competition. The athletes will be drawn into an elimination stage draw. Once a team lost a match, it will be not longer be able to compete. Each match will be contested as the best of three games.

Seeds
The following pairs were seeded:

 (champions)
  (final)

Results

Bracket

References

External links
Tournament software results

Men's doubles